The 2010 Ukrainian Football Amateur League season.

Teams

Returning
 Enerhiya Nova Kakhovka
 Elektrometalurh-NZF Nikopol
 Khimmash Korosten

Debut
List of teams that are debuting this season in the league.

FC Ternopil, Topilche Ternopil, Zviahel-750 Novohrad-Volynskyi, UkrAhroKom Holovkivka

Withdrawn
List of clubs that took part in last year competition, but chose not to participate in 2010 season:

 Kniahynyn Pidhaichyky
 Horyzont Koziatyn
 Zenit Boyarka
 Slovkhlib Slovyansk

 FC Luzhany
 KNTEU
 Khodak Cherkasy

 Zbruch Volochysk
 Irpin Horenychi
 Bastion-2 Illichivsk

Location map

First stage

Group 1

Group 2

Group 3

Finals

Group A

Group B

Championship match

References

External links
 Amateur League (2010). RSSSF

Ukrainian Football Amateur League seasons
Amateur
Amateur